Christianity and neopaganism overlap when the beliefs or practices of one religious path influence, or are adopted by, the other. Historically, Christianity sometimes took advantage of traditional pagan beliefs when it spread to new areas – a process known as inculturation. Thus newly established churches took on sites, practices or images belonging to indigenous belief systems as a way of making the new faith more acceptable.

More recently, in a parallel process, some followers of modern pagan paths have developed practices such as Christopaganism by blending Christian elements into neopagan practice.

Historical syncretism

Christianity and classical paganism had an uneasy relationship with each being at different times persecutor or persecuted. However each also influenced the other. For example, a 10th–11th-century manuscript in the British Library known as the Lacnunga describes a charm against poison said to have been invented by Christ while on the cross, which has parallels in Anglo-Saxon magic.

Modern syncretism

In the modern era, examples of syncretism may include Christians seeking to incorporate concepts of the Divine Feminine from neopaganism into Christianity or Neopagans seeking to incorporate figures such as Jesus or Mary into Wiccan worship.

Christopaganism
Joyce and River Higginbotham define Christopaganism as: "A spirituality that combines beliefs and practices of Christianity with beliefs and practices of Paganism, or that observes them in parallel." They give examples of people identifying as Pagan but observing both Pagan and Christian liturgical years, using the Rosary or observing a form of Communion.

See also

Christian mysticism
Christian views on magic
Esoteric Christianity
Folk Christianity
Semitic neopaganism

References

 
  First published as

Further reading 

 
  Also available from ProQuest.

 
Modern paganism and other religions